Microlab Inc. is a Sino-American global audio electronics manufacturer specializing in the research, development, and production of multimedia speakers, AV speakers, and peripheral products. Founded in 1998, Microlab was a joint venture invested by International Microlab Blue Electronics Technology Co., Ltd. and Shenzhen Microlab Technology Inc. Microlab currently has ownership of five factories producing loudspeaker, audio electronics, hardware molds, plastic molds, and loudspeaker boxes. Its products are sold worldwide in 40 countries including those in South Asia, North America, South America and the Middle East.

History
In June 1998 the Microlab laboratory was founded, specializing in R & D high-quality multimedia audio.
In March 1999, Microlab invests in a joint venture with the U.S. International Microlab Blue Electronics Technology Co., Ltd.
Microlab's product line passes the Great Wall certification in February 2000 and the British NQA of ISO9001: 2000 quality management system certification in January 2002.
Microlab first launched the "Independent Power Amplifier" Multimedia Audio A-6301 in October 2002.
Danish sound designer Peter Larsen President as chief designer becomes responsible for designing the Microlab speaker unit joins the company in December 2003.
December 2006 in Shenzhen Grand Industrial Zone Microlab Electric Industrial Park fully operational.

Products
Microlab specializes in producing audio electronics such as FineCone speakers, Portable iPod/iPhone docks, Multimedia Speakers, General stereo speakers, the TMN Series, home theatre systems, the Soundbar Series, and the PURE Signatory Series. It is also a producer of headphones.

References

External links
 

Audio equipment manufacturers of China
Manufacturing companies based in Shenzhen